In mathematics, the Courant minimax principle gives the eigenvalues of a real symmetric matrix. It is named after Richard Courant.

Introduction

The Courant minimax principle gives a condition for finding the eigenvalues for a real symmetric matrix. The Courant minimax principle is as follows:

For any real symmetric matrix A,
 

where  is any  matrix.

Notice that the vector x is an eigenvector to the corresponding eigenvalue λ.

The Courant minimax principle, as well as the maximum principle, can be visualized by imagining that if ||x|| = 1 is a hypersphere then the matrix A deforms that hypersphere into an ellipsoid. When the major axis on the intersecting hyperplane are maximized — i.e., the length of the quadratic form q(x) is maximized — this is the eigenvector, and its length is the eigenvalue. All other eigenvectors will be perpendicular to this.

The minimax principle also generalizes to eigenvalues of positive self-adjoint operators on Hilbert spaces, where it is commonly used to study the Sturm–Liouville problem.

See also 
 Min-max theorem
 Max–min inequality
 Rayleigh quotient

References

 (Pages 31–34; in most textbooks the "maximum-minimum method" is usually credited to Rayleigh and Ritz, who applied the calculus of variations in the theory of sound.)
Keener, James P. Principles of Applied Mathematics: Transformation and Approximation. Cambridge: Westview Press, 2000. 

Mathematical principles